Duqm is a port town on the Arabian Sea in central-eastern Oman. As of 2010, the population was 11,200.

History 
Duqm was a small fishing settlement of the Janubah tribe on the coast of southern Oman, when a party of soldiers of the Muscat and Oman Field Force and geologists of Petroleum Development Oman landed in February 1954 to begin the modern oil exploration of central Oman. Today it is an industrial oil town.

Special Economic Zone at Duqm (SEZAD) 
Duqm Fishing Port, located in the Special Economic Zone at Duqm (SEZAD), is the largest multi-purpose fishing port in the Sultanate of Oman, which lay out in an area of (600 hectares) and a depth of (10 m). Construction was completed in 2021. The main breakwater is 2.2 km long, the secondary breakwater is 1.1 km long and the total lengths of the Jetties are around 1.2 km long.

Duqm refinery, also located in SEZAD and occupying 900 hectares, is a large oil refinery under construction and expected to be completed in 2023.

Transportation 

Duqm Airport was opened in 2014 and services flights to the nation's capital Muscat. Duqm is also connected with road services. Mwasalat bus connects Muscat - Duqm - Salalah.

Climate 

Weather is pleasant throughout the year. However, dust storm or high wind (~50km/hr) observed from May to August.

See also 

 Transport in Oman

References 

Populated places in Oman
Al Wusta Governorate (Oman)